Nawab Faiz Ali Khan Bahadur (Muhammad Beg Khan Najm-i-Sani), was a ruler of the princely state of Banganapalle, including the Chenchelimala territory.

He was the second son of Nawab Ali Quli Khan Bahadur, sometime Vizier to Emperor Aurangzeb, by his wife, a sister of Imad ul-Mulk, Nawab Khwaja Muhammad Mubariz Khan Bahadur, Hizbar Jang, sometime Subedar of the Deccan and Vizier. He is variously described as grandson, son-in-law or adopted son of Muhammad Beg Khan-e Rosebahani, Qiladar of Banganapalle. He entered the service of the Adil Shahi sultans of Bijapur and was appointed Qiladar in succession to his adoptive father and namesake around 1686. He was confirmed in the jagir of Banganapalle by the Mughal viceroy of the Deccan sometime before 3 November 1719.

He succeeded to Chenchelimala on the death of his childless elder brother (Fazl Ali Khan Bahadur) sometime before 21 April 1738. He died at Banganapalle Fort sometime before 25 August 1759.

Trivia
 Faiz Ali Khan's younger brother was Yusuf Khan Bahadur, Nawab Muhammad Taqi Khan Bahadur was Nawab of Masulipatam, whose son was Nawab Hasan Ali Khan Bahadur, a very famous person in the nawabs of Masulipatam.

See also
Nawab of the Carnatic
Nawab of Masulipatam

References

1750s deaths
Year of birth unknown